Digitalis ferruginea, the rusty foxglove, is a species of flowering plant in the family Plantaginaceae, native to Hungary, Romania, Turkey and the Caucasus.

The Latin specific epithet ferruginea means “rusty coloured”, referring to the flowers.

As with all species of foxglove, all parts of this plant may cause severe discomfort and vomiting if eaten. Contact with the leaves may also cause an allergic reaction. This plant has gained the Royal Horticultural Society's Award of Garden Merit.

References

ferruginea
Plants described in 1753
Taxa named by Carl Linnaeus
Flora of Lebanon